Para você querido Caé is the first album released by the Italian singer Patrizia Laquidara.

It was published in 2001 by Velut Luna/Audio Records.

It is dedicated to the Brazilian singer Caetano Veloso and includes 16 songs of Brazilian music.

Tracks
 O ciúme (intro)
 Você é linda
 Sampa
 Carolina
 Itapuá
 A tua presença, Morena
 Eu sei que vou te amar
 Coração vagabundo
 O cu do mundo
 E preciso perdoar
 Cucurrucucú
 Lindeza
 Cajuina
 Meditação
 O ciúme
 Minha voz, minha vida

References 

Bossa nova albums
Patrizia Laquidara albums
2001 albums